Vaduz ( or , High Alemannic pronunciation: []) is the capital of Liechtenstein and also the seat of the national parliament. The city, which is located along the Rhine River, has 5,696 residents. The most prominent landmark of Vaduz is Vaduz Castle, being perched atop a steep hill overlooking the city. It is home to the reigning prince of Liechtenstein and the Liechtenstein princely family. The city's distinctive architecture is also displayed in landmarks such as the Cathedral of St. Florin, Government House, City Hall, the National Art Gallery, as well as the National Museum. Although Vaduz is the best-known town in the principality internationally, it is not the largest; neighbouring Schaan has a larger population.

Etymology 
The name of Vaduz had been first recorded as de Faduzes. The name of the settlement, like most other towns in the Rhine Valley region, is of Romance origin. The name can be traced back to Old Rhaeto-Romance root auadutg, meaning aqueduct, which in turn evolved from the Latin aquaeductus.

History

Vaduz is mentioned in historic 12th-century manuscripts as Faduzes. In 1322 a mention of the castle is made, which was sacked by the Swiss in 1499 during the Swabian War. The entire city was also destroyed.

In the 17th century the Liechtenstein family was seeking a seat in the Imperial diet, the Reichstag.  However, since they did not hold any territory that was directly under the Imperial throne, they were unable to meet the primary requirement to qualify.

The family yearned for the added power a seat in the Imperial government would bring, and therefore sought to acquire lands that would be reichsunmittelbar, or held without any feudal personage other than the Holy Roman Emperor himself having rights on the land. After some time, the family was able to arrange the purchase of the minuscule Herrschaft ("Lordship") of Schellenberg and countship of Vaduz (in 1699 and 1712 respectively) from the Hohenems. Tiny Schellenberg and Vaduz possessed exactly the political status required: no feudal lord other than the Emperor.

Thereby, on 23 January 1719, after purchase had been duly made, Charles VI, Holy Roman Emperor, decreed Vaduz and Schellenberg were united, and raised to the dignity of Fürstentum (principality) with the name "Liechtenstein" in honour of "[his] true servant, Anton Florian of Liechtenstein". It is on this date that Liechtenstein became a sovereign member state of the Holy Roman Empire. As a testament to the pure political expediency of the purchases, the Princes of Liechtenstein did not set foot in their new principality for over 120 years.

Geography

Climate 
Vaduz features an oceanic climate with warm summers and chilly winters. Köppen-Geiger climate classification system classifies its climate as Marine West Coast Climate (Cfb). The city experiences a noticeable increase in precipitation during the summer, but in general all twelve months see some precipitation.

Main sights
Vaduz Castle is the home of the reigning prince of Liechtenstein and the Liechtenstein princely family. The castle is visible from almost any location in Vaduz, being perched atop a steep hill in the middle of the city.  The Cathedral of St. Florin, Government House and City Hall display the various styles and periods of architecture in the city.

Demographics 
As of 2019, 5,696 people lived in Vaduz. Foreigners resident in the city make up 42% of the population.
With 67% the population is predominantly Roman Catholic, while the percentage of Catholics is significantly higher among residents with Liechtenstein nationality (81%) than among foreigner residents (47%). The largest minority religions in the city are Protestantism (10%) and Islam (8%).

Culture 
The National Art Gallery as well as the National Museum are located in Vaduz. The art gallery (Kunstmuseum Liechtenstein) is a museum of modern and contemporary art, also showing displays from the private princely Liechtenstein Collection, the main public display of which is in Vienna. The building is an architectural landmark built by the Swiss architects Morger, Degelo and Kerez. It was completed in November 2000 and forms a "black box" of tinted concrete and black basalt stone. The museum collection is also the national art collection of Liechtenstein. The Liechtenstein National Museum is showing a permanent exhibition on the cultural and natural history of Liechtenstein as well as special exhibitions. There are also the Postage Stamp Museum and a Ski Museum.

Economy and transport
 
There are frequent bus connections between nearby mainline railway stations including Buchs, Sargans and Feldkirch, operated by Liechtenstein Bus.
 
Vaduz has no railway station as such and is not directly served by a railway line. Schaan-Vaduz is one of the four train stations serving Liechtenstein. It is located in the town of Schaan, a couple of kilometres north of Vaduz. It is owned by the Austrian Federal Railways (ÖBB). The station is served by eighteen regional, stopping trains per day, nine in each direction between Switzerland and Austria. It is situated on the international and electrified Feldkirch-Buchs line, between the station of in Buchs SG (in Switzerland) and the stop of Forst Hilti (in the northern suburb of Schaan).

Education
Vaduz has two primary schools, Äule Primary School, near the Vaduzer-Saal; and Ebenholz Primary School, near the University of Liechtenstein, which is also located in the city. Both schools have the same secretariat and administration. The school assignments of children are largely determined by their street addresses. There are four kindergarten sites, of the Kindergarten Bartlegrosch, in Vaduz.

Realschule Vaduz and Oberschule Vaduz are in the Schulzentrum Mühleholz II in Vaduz. Liechtensteinisches Gymnasium is also located in Vaduz. Realschule Schaan and Sportschule Liechtenstein are in nearby Schaan.

Notable People 

 Alois, Hereditary Prince of Liechtenstein (born 1968 in Zürich), regent of Liechtenstein since 2004
 Prince Aloys of Liechtenstein (1869–1955), prince who renounced his rights to the succession on 26 February 1923, in favor of his son Franz Joseph II
 Marlies Amann-Marxer (born 1952), politician who served as Minister of Infrastructure, Environment and Sport in the Government of the Principality of Liechtenstein
 Evelyne Bermann (born 1950) artist, specializes in glass acrylics
 Barbara Erni (1743–1785) thief and confidence trickster, the last person to be executed in Liechtenstein
 Franz Joseph II, Prince of Liechtenstein (1906–1989 in Grabs), the reigning Prince of Liechtenstein from 1938 until his death; lived full-time in the principality
 Aurelia Frick (born 1975) a Liechtenstein politician, Minister of Foreign Affairs, Education and Culture.
 Carl von In der Maur (1852 in Wiener Neustadt – 1913), government official
 Gilbert von In der Maur (1887–1959), military officer, leading figure of the Austrian National Socialist Party
 Wolfgang Haas (born 1948), first archbishop of the Archdiocese of Vaduz
 Hans-Adam II, Prince of Liechtenstein (born 1945 in Zurich) the monarch and head of state of Liechtenstein, lives in Vaduz Castle
 Adrian Hasler (born 1964), politician and the current Prime Minister of Liechtenstein
 Alexander Kellner (born 1961), Brazilian geologist and paleontologist, expert in pterosaurs
 Ruslaan Mumtaz (born 1982), Indian Bollywood film and television actor
 Medea de Novara (1905–2001), actress who appeared in Mexican films
 Josef Ospelt (1881–1962), first Prime Minister of Liechtenstein from 2 March 1921 to 27 April 1922
 Ida Ospelt-Amann (1899-1996), poet who wrote and performed in the Vaduz' Alemannic dialect
 Hermine Rheinberger (1864–1932), writer
 Josef Rheinberger (1839–1901), organist and composer
 Christoph Zeller (born 1956 or 1957), German billionaire businessman, owns Ivoclar Vivadent

Footballers 

 Ronny Büchel (born 1982), international footballer, played 72 games for the national side
 Andreas Christen (born 1989), international footballer, played 27 games for the national side
 Mathias Christen (born 1987), international footballer, played 36 games for the national side
 Lucas Eberle (born 1990), played 12 games for the national side
 Philippe Erne (born 1986), international footballer, 34 games for the national side
 Maximilian Göppel (born 1997), plays for FC Vaduz and the Liechtenstein national team
 Nicolas Hasler (born 1991), professional footballer, played 55 games for the national side
 Rainer Hasler (1958–2014), played as a defender, selected by the Liechtenstein Football Association as the country's Golden Player
 Marco Ritzberger (born 1986), played for FC Vaduz and played 35 games for the national side
 Dennis Salanović (born 1996), international footballer, played 29 games for the national side
 Sandro Wieser (born 1993), professional footballer, played 47 games for the national side

Other athletes 

 Franz Biedermann (born 1946) a Liechtenstein decathlete, competed in the 1968 Summer Olympics
 Kathinka von Deichmann (born 1994), tennis player
 Markus Ganahl (born 1975) retired alpine skier, competed in the 2002 Winter Olympics
 Nicola Kindle (born 1991), alpine skier
 Marina Nigg (born 1984), alpine skier, competed at the 2010 Winter Olympics
 Daniel Rinner (born 1990), cyclist
 Stephanie Vogt (born 1990), retired professional tennis player
 Tina Weirather (born 1989), World Cup alpine ski racer
 Guido Wolf (born 1924), former sports shooter, competed at the 1960 Summer Olympics

See also

List of foundations established in Vaduz
Rheinpark Stadion
Schaan-Vaduz railway station
Vaduz Castle
Vaduz Cathedral

References

External links

 

 
Capitals in Europe
Cities in Liechtenstein
Municipalities of Liechtenstein
Populated places on the Rhine
Liechtenstein–Switzerland border crossings